Lover Come Back is a 1961 American Eastmancolor romantic comedy film released by Universal Pictures and directed by Delbert Mann. It stars Doris Day and Rock Hudson and is their second time working together. The supporting cast includes Tony Randall, Edie Adams, Ann B. Davis, and Donna Douglas.

Day, Hudson and Randall appeared in three movies together, the others being Pillow Talk (1959) and Send Me No Flowers (1964).

The story is similar to that of Pillow Talk in that it includes mistaken identity as a key plot device. Although not as well known as Pillow Talk, the script by Stanley Shapiro and Paul Henning earned an Academy Award nomination for Best Original Screenplay.

Plot
In a New York advertising agency, Jerry Webster, a Madison Avenue ad executive, has achieved success not through hard work or intelligence but by wining and dining his clients, even setting them up on dates with attractive girls.

Jerry's equal and sworn enemy at a rival agency is Carol Templeton. Although she has never met him, Carol is disgusted by Jerry's unethical tactics and reports him to the Ad Council. Jerry avoids trouble with his usual aplomb, sending a comely chorus girl, Rebel Davis, to seduce the council members.

In exchange for her cooperation, Jerry promised Rebel a spot in commercials, so he goes ahead and arranges shoots of some featuring her for "VIP", a nonexistent product. He has no intention of allowing them to be shown, but the perplexed company president, Pete Ramsey, orders them broadcast on television.

This means Jerry must come up with a product quickly. So, he bribes a chemist, Dr. Linus Tyler, to create one. When Carol mistakes Jerry for Tyler, he pretends to be the chemist, so that in her attempt to steal the account from Jerry, she is actually wining, dining, golfing, and frolicking at the beach with him as Tyler.

Carol ultimately learns the truth. Appalled, she once more reports him to the Ad Council, this time for promoting a product that does not exist. Jerry, however, arrives at the hearing with VIP, a mint-flavored candy Dr. Tyler has just created. He provides many free samples to everyone there, including Carol.

VIP turns out to be intoxicating, each piece having the same effect as a triple martini. Its extreme effects lead to a one-night stand between Carol (who has a low tolerance for alcohol) and her bitter rival, Jerry, in a motel in Maryland, complete with a marriage license.

Carol has the marriage annulled. Representatives from the liquor industry visit Jerry, saying he will be paid well to pull VIP off the market and destroy the formula. Jerry convinces them to give Carol's firm 25% of its $60 million ($ million today) annual advertising expenditures, then burns the formula. He leaves New York to work in his company's San Francisco branch—only to be called back nine months later to remarry Carol in a hospital maternity ward, just before she gives birth to their child.

Cast

Songs
Although not a musical, the film contains two songs sung by Day: "Lover Come Back" during the opening credits, and "Should I Surrender" as she contemplates what to do with her feelings for Jerry.

Novelization
Slightly in advance of the film's release, as was the custom of the era, a paperback novelization of the screenplay was published by Gold Medal Books. The author was renowned crime and western novelist Marvin H. Albert, who also made something of a cottage industry out of movie tie-ins. He seems to have been the most prolific screenplay novelizer of the late '50s through mid '60s, and, during that time, the preeminent specialist at light comedy.

Notes
 Jack Oakie's final film
 The original ending had Carol and Jerry getting drunk on VIP and checking into a hotel. Doris Day insisted the concluding events be rewritten, having Carol and Jerry get married in their drunken state before going to bed.
 Remade into Zoom (2016 Kannada film)
Remade into the 1984 film “wahda bi whada” starring Adel Imam and Mervat Ameen.

Reception
The film received positive reviews from critics. Bosley Crowther of The New York Times called the film "one of the brightest, most delightful satiric comedies since 'It Happened One Night.'" Variety declared, "This is a funny, most-of-the-time engaging, smartly produced show." Harrison's Reports gave the film a rating of "GOOD", adding: "It's lots of fun most of the time even though the theme of boy fights girl, boy falls in love with girl and vice versa has been done quite often and in similar detail before." Philip K. Scheuer of the Los Angeles Times wrote, "we can testify to the frequent hilarity with which everybody concerned has infused this familiar farcical mixup, double-entendres and all." Brendan Gill of The New Yorker called the film "extremely funny and therefore not to be missed," and Richard L. Coe of The Washington Post deemed it "funny and worldly from start to finish ... Blond Doris has never been more attractive or spirited and Hudson has become an adept farceur." The Monthly Film Bulletin offered a less enthusiastic review, writing: "Alas, the aquarium scene is the film's high-water mark. After it, the sex comedy is transformed into slushy romance ... Occasionally Tony Randall's satirical zaniness salvages a laugh, but Rock Hudson and a subdued Doris Day, who do well enough with the wisecracks earlier, put little life into the love scenes when these usurp the narrative."

Awards and nominations

See also
 List of American films of 1961

References

External links
 
 
 
 
 

1960s English-language films
1960s sex comedy films
1961 films
1961 romantic comedy films
American romantic comedy films
American sex comedy films
Films about advertising
Films directed by Delbert Mann
Films scored by Frank De Vol
Films set in New York City
Universal Pictures films
1960s American films